{{Infobox film
| name           = Alice in Wonderland
| image          = Alice's-Adventures-in-Wonderland-1910.jpg
| caption        = 
| director       = Edwin S. Porter
| writer         = Lewis Carroll (book)
| starring       = Gladys Hulette
| distributor    = Edison Manufacturing Company
| based_on       = {{Based on|Alice's Adventures in Wonderland by Lewis Carroll}}
| released       = 
| runtime        = 10 minutes
| country        = United States
| language       = Silent film
}}Alice's Adventures in Wonderland is a 10-minute black-and-white silent film made in the United States in 1910, and is based on Lewis Carroll's 1865 book of the same name.

Made by the Edison Manufacturing Company and directed by Edwin S. Porter, the film starred Gladys Hulette as Alice. Being a silent film, naturally all of Lewis Carroll's nonsensical prose could not be used, and, being only a one-reel picture, most of Carroll's memorable characters in his original 1865 novel similarly could not be included. What was used in the film was faithful in spirit to Carroll, and in design to the original John Tenniel illustrations. Variety'' complimented the picture by comparing it favorably to the "foreign" film fantasies then flooding American cinemas.

Gallery

See also
 List of American films of 1910

References

External links
Alice's Adventures in Wonderland at the Internet Movie Database
Alice's Adventures in Wonderland on Comic Vine
Alice's Adventures in Wonderland on Complete Index to World Cinema

1910 films
1910s fantasy films
1910 short films
Films based on Alice in Wonderland
American black-and-white films
American silent short films
Films based on multiple works
American fantasy films
Films directed by Edwin S. Porter
1910s American films
Silent adventure films